This is a list of writings published by Sigmund Freud. Books are either linked or in italics.

Selected works
 1884 On Coca
 1891 On Aphasia
 1892 A Case of Successful Treatment by Hypnotism
 1893 Charcot
 1893 On the Psychical Mechanism of Hysterical Phenomena
 1894 The Neuro-Psychoses of Defence
 1894 Obsessions and phobias
 1894 On the Grounds for Detaching a Particular Syndrome from Neurasthenia under the Description “Anxiety Neurosis”
 1895 Project for a Scientific Psychology
 1895 Studies on Hysteria (German: Studien über Hysterie; co-authored with Josef Breuer)
 1896 The Aetiology of Hysteria
 1896 Heredity and the Aetiology of the Neuroses
 1896 Further Remarks on the Neuro-Psychoses of Defence
 1898 Sexuality in the Aetiology of the Neuroses
 1899 Screen Memories
 1899 An Autobiographical Note
 1899 The Interpretation of Dreams (German: Die Traumdeutung)
 1901 On Dreams (abridged version of The Interpretation of Dreams)
 1904 The Psychopathology of Everyday Life (German: Zur Psychopathologie des Alltagslebens)
 1905 Jokes and their Relation to the Unconscious
 1905 Fragment of an Analysis of a Case of Hysteria (Dora)
 1905 Three Essays on the Theory of Sexuality (German: Drei Abhandlungen zur Sexualtheorie)
 1905 On Psychotherapy
 1905 Psychopathic Characters on the Stage	
 1906 My Views on the Part Played by Sexuality in the Aetiology of the Neuroses
 1906 Psycho-Analysis and the Establishment of the Facts in Legal Proceedings
 1907 Obsessive Actions and Religious Practices
 1907 Delusions and Dreams in Jensen's Gradiva (German: Der Wahn und die Träume in W. Jensens "Gradiva")
 1908 The Sexual Enlightenment of Children
 1908 Character and Anal Erotism (German: Charakter und Analerotik)
 1908 On the Sexual Theories of Children
 1908 "Civilized" Sexual Morality and Modern Nervous Illness (German: Die „kulturelle“ Sexualmoral und die moderne Nervosität)
 1908 Creative Writers and Day-Dreaming
 1908 Hysterical Phantasies and their Relation to Bisexuality
 1909 Family Romances 
 1909 Some General Remarks on Hysterical Attacks
 1909 Analysis of a Phobia in a Five-Year-Old Boy (Little Hans)
 1909 Notes upon a Case of Obsessional Neurosis (Rat Man)
 1910 Five Lectures on Psycho-Analysis
 1910 Leonardo da Vinci, a Memory of his Childhood (German: Eine Kindheitserinnerung des Leonardo da Vinci)
 1910 The Antithetical Meaning of Primal Words
 1910 The Future Prospects of Psycho-analytic Therapy 
 1910  “Wild” psycho-analysis       
 1910 The Psycho-Analytic View of Psychogenic Disturbance of Vision
 1910 A Special Type of Choice of Object made by Men
 1911 The Handling of Dream-Interpretation in Psycho-Analysis
 1911 Formulations on the Two Principles of Mental Functioning'
 1911 Psycho-Analytic Notes on an Autobiographical Account of a Case of Paranoia (Schreber)
 1912 On the Universal Tendency to Debasement in the Sphere of Love
 1912 Recommendations to Physicians Practising Psycho-analysis 
 1912 Types of Onset of Neurosis	
 1912 The Dynamics of Transference
 1912 Contributions to a Discussion on Masturbation 
 1912 A Note on the Unconscious in Psycho-Analysis
 1913 Totem and Taboo: Resemblances Between the Psychic Lives of Savages and Neurotics (German: Totem und Tabu: Einige Übereinstimmungen im Seelenleben der Wilden und der Neurotiker)
 1913 The Claims of Psycho-Analysis to Scientific Interest   
 1913 On Beginning the Treatment (Further recommendations on the technique of psycho-analysis)  
 1913 The Disposition to Obsessional Neurosis  
 1913 Theme of the Three Caskets
 1914 Remembering, Repeating and Working-through (Further recommendations on the technique of psycho-analysis) 
 1914 On Narcissism: an Introduction   
 1914 The Moses of Michelangelo 
 1914 On the History of the Psycho-Analytic Movement (German: Zur Geschichte der psychoanalytischen Bewegung)
 1915–17 Introductory Lectures on Psycho-Analysis (German: Vorlesungen zur Einführung in die Psychoanalyse)
 1915 Observations on Transference-Love (Further recommendations on the technique of psycho-analysis)
 1915 Thoughts for the Times on War and Death (German: Zeitgemäßes über Krieg und Tod)
 1915 Instincts and their Vicissitudes
 1915 Repression  
 1915 The Unconscious
 1915 A Case of Paranoia Running Counter to the Psycho-Analytic Theory of the Disease     
 1915 Some Character-Types Met with in Psycho-Analytic Work
 1915 On Transience
 1916 A Mythological Parallel to a Visual Obsession
 1917 Mourning and Melancholia
 1917 A Difficulty on the Path of Psycho-Analysis  
 1917 On Transformations of Instinct as Exemplified in Anal Erotism  
 1917 A Metapsychological Supplement to the Theory of Dreams
 1918 From the History of an Infantile Neurosis (Wolfman)
 1918 The Taboo of Virginity
 1918 Lines of Advance in Psycho-Analytic Therapy
 1918 Introduction to Psycho-Analysis and the War Neuroses
 1918 On the Teaching of Psycho-Analysis in the Universities
 1918 James J. Putnam
 1919 A Child is Being Beaten
 1919 The Uncanny (German: Das Unheimliche)
 1920 The Psychogenesis of a Case of Homosexuality in a Woman
 1920 Beyond the Pleasure Principle (German: Jenseits des Lustprinzips)
 1920 A Note on the Prehistory of The Technique of Analysis
 1920 Supplements to the Theory of Dreams
 1921 Psycho-analysis and Telepathy
 1921 Group Psychology and the Analysis of the Ego (German: Massenpsychologie und Ich-Analyse)
 1922 Medusa's Head (German: Das Medusenhaupt)
 1922 Dreams and Telepathy 
 1922 Some Neurotic Mechanisms in Jealousy, Paranoia and Homosexuality
 1923 The Ego and the Id (German: Das Ich und das Es)
 1923 A Seventeenth-Century Demonological Neurosis (Christoph Haizmann)
 1923 Infantile Genital Organisation
 1924 Neurosis and Psychosis
 1924 The Loss of Reality in Neurosis and Psychosis
 1924 The Economic Problem of Masochism
 1924 The Dissolution of the Oedipus Complex
 1925 The Resistances to Psycho-analysis
 1925 Josef Breuer
 1925 A Note upon the "Mystic Writing-Pad"
 1925 An Autobiographical Study (1935 Postscript)
 1925 Negation
 1925 Some Psychical Consequences of the Anatomical Distinction between the Sexes
 1926 Karl Abraham
 1926 Inhibitions, Symptoms and Anxiety
 1926 The Question of Lay Analysis (German: Die Frage der Laieanalyse)
 1927 The Future of an Illusion (German: Die Zukunft einer Illusion)
 1927 Fetishism
 1927 Humour
 1928 Dostoevsky and Parricide
 1930 Civilization and Its Discontents (German: Das Unbehagen in der Kultur)
 1931 Libidinal Types
 1931 Female Sexuality  
 1932 The Acquisition of Control Over Fire
 1933 Sandor Ferenczi
 1933 New Introductory Lectures on Psycho-Analysis
 1933 Why War? (German: Warum Krieg? co-authored with Albert Einstein) 
 1936 A Disturbance of Memory on the Acropolis
 1937 Lou Andreas-Salome
 1937 Analysis Terminable and Interminable
 1937 Constructions in Analysis
 1938 An Outline of Psycho-Analysis (German: Abriß der Psychoanalyse)
 1938 Some Elementary Lessons in Psycho-Analysis
 1938 The Splitting of the Ego in the Process of Defence
 1938 A Comment on Anti-Semitism 
 1939 Moses and Monotheism (German: Der Mann Moses und die monotheistische Religion)

The Standard Edition
The Standard Edition of the Complete Psychological Works of Sigmund Freud. Trans. from the German under the general editorship of James Strachey, in collaboration with Anna Freud, assisted by Alix Strachey, Alan Tyson, and Angela Richards. 24 volumes, London: Hogarth Press and the Institute of Psycho-Analysis, 1953-1974.
 Vol. I Pre-Psycho-Analytic Publications and Unpublished Drafts (1886-1899).
 Vol. II Studies in Hysteria (1893-1895). By Josef Breuer and S. Freud
 Vol. III Early Psycho-Analytic Publications (1893-1899)
 Vol. IV The Interpretation of Dreams (I) (1900)
 Vol. V The Interpretation of Dreams (II) and On Dreams (1900-1901)
 Vol. VI The Psychopathology of Everyday Life (1901)
 Vol. VII A Case of Hysteria, Three Essays on Sexuality and Other Works (1901-1905)
 Vol. VIII Jokes and their Relation to the Unconscious (1905)
 Vol. IX Jensen's 'Gradiva', and Other Works (1906-1909)
 Vol. X The Cases of 'Little Hans' and the Rat Man' (1909)
 Vol. XI Five Lectures on Psycho-Analysis, Leonardo and Other Works (1910)
 Vol. XII Case History of Schreber, Papers on Technique and Other Works (1911-1913)
 Vol. XIII Totem and Taboo and Other Works (1913-1914)
 Vol. XIV On the History of the Psycho-Analytic Movement, Papers on Meta-psychology and Other Works (1914-1916)
 Vol. XV Introductory Lectures on Psycho-Analysis (Parts I and II) (1915-1916)
 Vol. XVI Introductory Lectures on Psycho-Analysis (Part III) (1916-1917)
 Vol. XVII An Infantile Neurosis and Other Works (1917-1919)
 Vol. XVIII Beyond the Pleasure Principle, Group Psychology and Other Works (1920-1922)
 Vol. XIX The Ego and the Id and Other Works (1923-1925)
 Vol. XX An Autobiographical Study, Inhibitions, Symptoms and Anxiety, Lay Analysis and Other Works (1925-1926)
 Vol. XXI The Future of an Illusion, Civilization and its Discontents and Other Works (1927-1931)
 Vol. XXII New Introductory Lectures on Psycho-Analysis and Other Works (1932-1936)
 Vol. XXIII Moses and Monotheism, An Outline of Psycho-Analysis and Other Works (1937-1939)
 Vol. XXIV Indexes and Bibliographies (Compiled by Angela Richards, 1974)

References
 Bibliography of Sigmund Freud's writings

External links

Works by Sigmund Freud
Psychology bibliographies
Sigmund Freud